Armored Command is a 1961 American war drama film directed by Byron Haskin and starring  Howard Keel and Tina Louise. It was filmed in Hohenfels, Bavaria, but takes place in the Vosges Mountains during the Southern France campaign.

"It was the one picture that Howard Keel didn't sing on", reminisced Burt Reynolds later. "That was a terrible mistake."

Plot
The Germans use a female spy to infiltrate an American position to get information on the movement of troops at the height of the Ardennes offensive.

Cast
 Howard Keel as Colonel Devlin
 Tina Louise as Alexandra Bastegar 
 Warner Anderson as Lieutenant Colonel Wilson
 Earl Holliman as Mike
 Carleton Young as Captain Bart Macklin 
 Burt Reynolds as "Skee"
 James Dobson as Arab
 Marty Ingels as "Pinhead"
 Clem Harvey as "Tex"
 Maurice Marsac as Jean Robert
 Lieutenant Colonel Thomas A. Ryan as Major
 Peter Capell as Little General
 Charles Nolte as Captain Swan
 Brandon Maggart

Production
Ron Alcorn produced and directed the film and raised finance via Allied Artists. Filming started 21 November 1960.

Lt. Col. Thomas A. Ryan, who appeared in the film as the Major, also acted as the film's technical advisor.

Reception
The Los Angeles Times called the film "fairly good but it could have been better. A kind of poor man's Battleground." The New York Times called it an "improbable little melodrama".

Lawsuit
Major General Daniel H. Hudelson (retired), who commanded the 40th California National Guard in Korea and fought in the Battle of the Bulge, sued Allied Artists and Ronald Alcorn for $350,000 alleging unauthorised use of his story ideas. He claimed in 1955 he sent a tape recording of his experiences in the Vosges Mountains in France to a film company, and said they used his ideas in the film. He claimed the film had earned profits of $1.5 million.

References

External links

1961 films
1960s war drama films
Allied Artists films
American black-and-white films
Films directed by Byron Haskin
Western Front of World War II films
Films set in France
Films shot in Bavaria
American World War II films
1960s English-language films
1960s American films